The 1956–57 New York Rangers season was the franchise's 31st season.

Regular season

Season Standings

Record vs. opponents

Schedule and results

|- align="center" bgcolor="#CCFFCC"
| 1 || 12 || @ Chicago Black Hawks || 3–0 || 1–0–0
|- align="center" bgcolor="#FFBBBB"
| 2 || 14 || @ Detroit Red Wings || 2–1 || 1–1–0
|- align="center" bgcolor="#CCFFCC"
| 3 || 17 || Boston Bruins || 2–0 || 2–1–0
|- align="center" bgcolor="#FFBBBB"
| 4 || 20 || @ Montreal Canadiens || 5–0 || 2–2–0
|- align="center" bgcolor="#CCFFCC"
| 5 || 21 || Chicago Black Hawks || 4–1 || 3–2–0
|- align="center" bgcolor="#CCFFCC"
| 6 || 24 || Montreal Canadiens || 3–2 || 4–2–0
|- align="center" bgcolor="white"
| 7 || 28 || Toronto Maple Leafs || 1–1 || 4–2–1
|- align="center" bgcolor="#FFBBBB"
| 8 || 31 || @ Toronto Maple Leafs || 7–2 || 4–3–1
|-

|- align="center" bgcolor="#FFBBBB"
| 9 || 4 || @ Boston Bruins || 4–1 || 4–4–1
|- align="center" bgcolor="#FFBBBB"
| 10 || 7 || Boston Bruins || 4–2 || 4–5–1
|- align="center" bgcolor="#FFBBBB"
| 11 || 8 || @ Montreal Canadiens || 4–2 || 4–6–1
|- align="center" bgcolor="#FFBBBB"
| 12 || 10 || Detroit Red Wings || 6–4 || 4–7–1
|- align="center" bgcolor="#FFBBBB"
| 13 || 14 || Montreal Canadiens || 5–3 || 4–8–1
|- align="center" bgcolor="white"
| 14 || 17 || Boston Bruins || 4–4 || 4–8–2
|- align="center" bgcolor="white"
| 15 || 18 || @ Chicago Black Hawks || 2–2 || 4–8–3
|- align="center" bgcolor="white"
| 16 || 21 || Toronto Maple Leafs || 3–3 || 4–8–4
|- align="center" bgcolor="#CCFFCC"
| 17 || 22 || @ Boston Bruins || 4–3 || 5–8–4
|- align="center" bgcolor="#FFBBBB"
| 18 || 24 || @ Montreal Canadiens || 6–1 || 5–9–4
|- align="center" bgcolor="white"
| 19 || 25 || Montreal Canadiens || 1–1 || 5–9–5
|- align="center" bgcolor="#CCFFCC"
| 20 || 28 || Boston Bruins || 2–1 || 6–9–5
|- align="center" bgcolor="#FFBBBB"
| 21 || 29 || @ Detroit Red Wings || 4–1 || 6–10–5
|-

|- align="center" bgcolor="#CCFFCC"
| 22 || 2 || Toronto Maple Leafs || 4–2 || 7–10–5
|- align="center" bgcolor="white"
| 23 || 5 || Chicago Black Hawks || 2–2 || 7–10–6
|- align="center" bgcolor="white"
| 24 || 8 || @ Toronto Maple Leafs || 0–0 || 7–10–7
|- align="center" bgcolor="#CCFFCC"
| 25 || 9 || Detroit Red Wings || 4–2 || 8–10–7
|- align="center" bgcolor="#FFBBBB"
| 26 || 13 || @ Detroit Red Wings || 2–1 || 8–11–7
|- align="center" bgcolor="#FFBBBB"
| 27 || 15 || @ Toronto Maple Leafs || 2–1 || 8–12–7
|- align="center" bgcolor="#CCFFCC"
| 28 || 16 || Montreal Canadiens || 4–2 || 9–12–7
|- align="center" bgcolor="#CCFFCC"
| 29 || 21 || @ Chicago Black Hawks || 3–2 || 10–12–7
|- align="center" bgcolor="#FFBBBB"
| 30 || 23 || Toronto Maple Leafs || 3–1 || 10–13–7
|- align="center" bgcolor="#FFBBBB"
| 31 || 25 || @ Detroit Red Wings || 8–1 || 10–14–7
|- align="center" bgcolor="#CCFFCC"
| 32 || 27 || Chicago Black Hawks || 3–2 || 11–14–7
|- align="center" bgcolor="#FFBBBB"
| 33 || 29 || @ Montreal Canadiens || 6–3 || 11–15–7
|- align="center" bgcolor="#FFBBBB"
| 34 || 31 || Detroit Red Wings || 1–0 || 11–16–7
|-

|- align="center" bgcolor="#FFBBBB"
| 35 || 1 || @ Boston Bruins || 5–3 || 11–17–7
|- align="center" bgcolor="#CCFFCC"
| 36 || 5 || Chicago Black Hawks || 4–1 || 12–17–7
|- align="center" bgcolor="#FFBBBB"
| 37 || 6 || Montreal Canadiens || 3–2 || 12–18–7
|- align="center" bgcolor="#FFBBBB"
| 38 || 9 || Toronto Maple Leafs || 4–3 || 12–19–7
|- align="center" bgcolor="#CCFFCC"
| 39 || 11 || @ Chicago Black Hawks || 7–4 || 13–19–7
|- align="center" bgcolor="#CCFFCC"
| 40 || 12 || @ Detroit Red Wings || 5–4 || 14–19–7
|- align="center" bgcolor="#FFBBBB"
| 41 || 13 || Detroit Red Wings || 3–2 || 14–20–7
|- align="center" bgcolor="#FFBBBB"
| 42 || 19 || @ Montreal Canadiens || 5–0 || 14–21–7
|- align="center" bgcolor="#FFBBBB"
| 43 || 20 || @ Detroit Red Wings || 5–2 || 14–22–7
|- align="center" bgcolor="white"
| 44 || 23 || @ Toronto Maple Leafs || 4–4 || 14–22–8
|- align="center" bgcolor="#CCFFCC"
| 45 || 26 || @ Boston Bruins || 5–3 || 15–22–8
|- align="center" bgcolor="#CCFFCC"
| 46 || 27 || @ Chicago Black Hawks || 3–2 || 16–22–8
|- align="center" bgcolor="#FFBBBB"
| 47 || 30 || Chicago Black Hawks || 7–2 || 16–23–8
|-

|- align="center" bgcolor="#FFBBBB"
| 48 || 2 || Detroit Red Wings || 5–4 || 16–24–8
|- align="center" bgcolor="#FFBBBB"
| 49 || 3 || @ Boston Bruins || 4–1 || 16–25–8
|- align="center" bgcolor="#CCFFCC"
| 50 || 6 || Boston Bruins || 3–2 || 17–25–8
|- align="center" bgcolor="white"
| 51 || 7 || @ Chicago Black Hawks || 4–4 || 17–25–9
|- align="center" bgcolor="white"
| 52 || 9 || @ Toronto Maple Leafs || 4–4 || 17–25–10
|- align="center" bgcolor="#CCFFCC"
| 53 || 10 || Montreal Canadiens || 5–4 || 18–25–10
|- align="center" bgcolor="#FFBBBB"
| 54 || 14 || @ Detroit Red Wings || 3–2 || 18–26–10
|- align="center" bgcolor="#CCFFCC"
| 55 || 16 || @ Montreal Canadiens || 2–1 || 19–26–10
|- align="center" bgcolor="#CCFFCC"
| 56 || 17 || Toronto Maple Leafs || 3–2 || 20–26–10
|- align="center" bgcolor="#CCFFCC"
| 57 || 20 || Boston Bruins || 5–2 || 21–26–10
|- align="center" bgcolor="#FFBBBB"
| 58 || 23 || @ Montreal Canadiens || 4–1 || 21–27–10
|- align="center" bgcolor="#CCFFCC"
| 59 || 24 || Montreal Canadiens || 4–3 || 22–27–10
|- align="center" bgcolor="white"
| 60 || 27 || Chicago Black Hawks || 6–6 || 22–27–11
|-

|- align="center" bgcolor="#CCFFCC"
| 61 || 2 || @ Boston Bruins || 3–2 || 23–27–11
|- align="center" bgcolor="white"
| 62 || 3 || Detroit Red Wings || 1–1 || 23–27–12
|- align="center" bgcolor="white"
| 63 || 7 || @ Chicago Black Hawks || 2–2 || 23–27–13
|- align="center" bgcolor="#CCFFCC"
| 64 || 9 || @ Toronto Maple Leafs || 2–1 || 24–27–13
|- align="center" bgcolor="#CCFFCC"
| 65 || 10 || Detroit Red Wings || 4–1 || 25–27–13
|- align="center" bgcolor="#FFBBBB"
| 66 || 13 || Boston Bruins || 2–1 || 25–28–13
|- align="center" bgcolor="#FFBBBB"
| 67 || 16 || @ Toronto Maple Leafs || 14–1 || 25–29–13
|- align="center" bgcolor="#FFBBBB"
| 68 || 17 || Toronto Maple Leafs || 5–3 || 25–30–13
|- align="center" bgcolor="#CCFFCC"
| 69 || 23 || @ Boston Bruins || 4–2 || 26–30–13
|- align="center" bgcolor="white"
| 70 || 24 || Chicago Black Hawks || 4–4 || 26–30–14
|-

Playoffs

Key:  Win  Loss

Player statistics
Skaters

Goaltenders

†Denotes player spent time with another team before joining Rangers. Stats reflect time with Rangers only.
‡Traded mid-season. Stats reflect time with Rangers only.

References

External links
 Rangers on Hockey Database

New York Rangers seasons
New York Rangers
New York Rangers
New York Rangers
New York Rangers
Madison Square Garden
1950s in Manhattan